Matthew John O'Toole MLA (born 18 May 1983) is an Irish Social Democratic and Labour Party (SDLP) politician, former civil servant, and journalist who has served as a Member of the Legislative Assembly (MLA) for the Belfast South constituency in the Northern Ireland Assembly since January 2020. He is the current Leader of the Opposition in the Northern Ireland Assembly.

Born in Belfast, O'Toole grew up in Downpatrick and read for an MA in International Relations and English at the University of St Andrews.

Prior to serving as an MLA, O'Toole worked as a journalist, and as a civil servant at HM Treasury and in 10 Downing Street. At Downing Street, O'Toole worked on the 2016 EU referendum and its aftermath. On leaving the civil service, O'Toole wrote widely on Brexit, its impact on Northern Ireland, and British-Irish relations. His writing has appeared in the Irish Times, Guardian, Financial Times, Politico, New Statesman and elsewhere. From 2017 to 2020, he was a senior consultant at Powerscourt, a communications consultancy based in London.

Political career 
O’Toole was co-opted into the Northern Ireland Assembly on 11 January 2020, replacing Claire Hanna who had been elected as MP for the constituency in the previous general election. Upon the restoration of devolution, O’Toole was appointed the SDLP's spokesperson for Brexit and Public Finance, sitting on the Finance and Public Accounts Committees.

In June 2020, O'Toole proposed a successful motion in the NI Assembly calling on the British Government to extend the Brexit transition period beyond 1 January 2021, describing any decision to not do so as "mad and dangerous" given the economic conditions caused by the COVID-19 pandemic.

During his time in the Assembly O’Toole has advocated for the rights of journalists in Northern Ireland. In December 2020, he founded and became chair of the All Party Group on Press Freedom and Media Sustainability.

The SDLP launched the “Expert Reference” panel of its New Ireland Commission in May 2021, which was convened by O’Toole. It included a broad range of panellists from across Northern Ireland to examine the potential shape of public and health services, the economy, and education in a united Ireland.

O’Toole has also been vocal of the negative impact of the “brain drain” to Northern Ireland. In July 2021 he proposed the “Make Change Programme”, an initiative to encourage young people to take jobs in the civil service, either through apprenticeships or through graduate programmes. It also intends to address what he sees as a looming workforce crisis in the civil service, with 1% of staff being under 25 and 80% of senior staff being over 50.

During a reshuffle in October 2021, O’Toole gained the responsibility of Economy Spokesperson and was appointed vice-chair of the Economy Committee.

O'Toole was selected as one of two SDLP candidates to contest the 2022 Northern Ireland Assembly election in Belfast South, alongside running mate Elsie Trainor. He was successfully re-elected with 5,394 first preference votes.

The SDLP returned with 8 seats and did not to nominate a replacement for Nichola Mallon as interim Minister for Infrastructure, instead choosing to form a "constructive opposition". On 25 July SDLP Leader Colum Eastwood announced that the party will be formally taking up the role of Official Opposition in the Northern Ireland Assembly, with O'Toole serving as its first Leader of the Opposition.

References

1983 births
Living people
Social Democratic and Labour Party MLAs
Northern Ireland MLAs 2017–2022
Northern Ireland MLAs 2022–2027
People from Downpatrick